Liravi-ye Miyani Rural District is in Imam Hassan District of Deylam County, Bushehr province, Iran. At the census of 2006, its population was 464 in 97 households; there were 313 inhabitants in 69 households at the following census of 2011; and in the most recent census of 2016, the population of the rural district was 232 in 62 households. The largest of its nine villages was Valfajar, with 138 people.

References 

Rural Districts of Bushehr Province
Populated places in Deylam County